Indian Railways does not have any operational high speed rail lines, though a total of twelve corridors are proposed, with the corridor between Mumbai and Ahmedabad under construction.

The corridor will use standard gauge, instead of the more prevalent broad gauge on the rest of the rail network, and will be built with Shinkansen technology. It is expected to carry passengers between the two cities in around three hours and the ticket prices are expected to be competitive with air travel. This project was initially targeted for completion by December 2023, however, owing mainly to land acquisition issues in Maharashtra and the COVID-19 pandemic, it is now expected to be completed by October 2028. However, a portion of this line between Surat and Bilimora is planned to be opened by 2026.

Background

At the 2014 general elections, the Bharatiya Janata Party (BJP) expressed its desire to build the Diamond Quadrilateral high speed rail project, which would connect the cities of Chennai, Delhi, Kolkata, and Mumbai via high-speed rail. This project was approved as a priority for the new government in the incoming president's speech. Construction of one kilometre of high speed railway track was estimated to cost  -  which is estimated to be 10-14 times higher than the cost of construction of standard railway.

The new high-speed rail lines with will be standard gauge, whereas older tracks which could be upgraded to higher speeds will have a  broad gauge. There can, therefore, be no interoperability between the new lines and the older-upgraded tracks for passenger and cargo traffic.

Definition and terminology

History 

The move from steam technology happened when the electrification was completed in Bombay Division. Due to the intervening world wars, Indian railways were unable to introduce electrification beyond the Bombay Division and hence steam locomotives dominated the lines in the rest of India. The era of diesel locomotives took shape in the 1960s when Indian Railways imported WDM-1 and WDM-2 class locomotives from the American company, ALCO. Although the WDM-1 struggled to cross the  speed mark, the subsequent introduction of WDM-2 and WDM-4 locomotives achieved these speeds for the most of the decade.

India began developing higher-speed rail by inaugurating the Howrah Rajdhani Express back in March 1969, five years after Japan inaugurated Shinkansen, the world's first high-speed rail which was running at twice the speed of Rajdhani Express. With the initiation of various electrification projects in the 1970s on the trunk routes, the electric locomotives soon began to replace their diesel counterparts.

After Indian Railways realised that the DC powered locomotives would soon be replaced by AC ones, they introduced the AC powered WAP-5 class locomotives, the first of its kind in India. These locomotives were imported to haul fast, short trains like the Shatabdi Express. They also featured fully suspended traction motors, reducing the impact on tracks and allowing faster speeds.

Two years later, Indian railways saw another breakthrough as they successfully developed the second indigenously built, semi-high-speed EMU train, the Vande Bharat Express based on MEMU.

First proposal
One of the first proposals to introduce high-speed trains in India was mooted in the mid-1980s by then railway minister, Madhavrao Scindia. A high-speed rail line between Delhi and Kanpur via Agra was proposed. An internal study found the proposal not be viable at that time due to the high cost of construction and the inability of passengers to bear much higher fares than those for normal trains. 
In a feasibility study published in 1987, RDSO and JICA estimated the construction costs to be ₹4.9 crore per km, for a line dedicated to  trains. In 2010, the 1987-estimated cost, inflated at 10% a year, would be ₹43.9 crore per km (US$9.5 million/km). 

Route plans
Under the Vision 2020 white paper in 2009, six corridors were identified for technical studies on setting up of high-speed rail corridors: Delhi–Chandigarh–Amritsar, Pune-Mumbai-Ahmedabad, Hyderabad-Warangal-Vijayawada-Chennai, Howrah–Haldia, Chennai-Bengaluru-Coimbatore-Kochi-Thiruvananthapuram, Delhi-Agra-Kanpur-Lucknow-Varanasi-Patna-Guwahati. These high-speed rail corridors were planned to be built as elevated corridors.

NHRCL formation

Rail Vikas Nigam Ltd. (RVNL) set up a corporation called High Speed Rail Corporation of India Ltd (HSRC) on 25 July 2013, which would deal with the proposed high-speed rail corridor projects. The corporation was a wholly-owned subsidiary of RVNL. It was supposed to handle the tendering, pre-feasibility studies, awarding of contracts, and execution of the projects. The corporation would comprise four members, all of whom will be railway officials. All high-speed rail lines would be implemented as public–private partnerships on a Design, Build, Finance, Operate, and Transfer (DBFOT) basis. The corporation was officially formed on 29 October 2013. Later on 12 February 2016, the Ministry of Railways replaced it with the 'National High-Speed Rail Corporation Limited'. It acted as a government company to administer the construction and operation of high-speed rail corridors.

First construction

Construction of the Mumbai–Ahmedabad high-speed rail corridor, India's first high-speed rail corridor, was initiated in 2017 and is expected to be completed by 2028. The foundation stone ceremony was held on 14 September 2018 when Japanese Prime Minister Shinzō Abe and the Prime Minister of India, Narendra Modi, flagged off the construction work in Ahmedabad. The JR East/Hitachi E5 Series Shinkansen trains will be used in this line.

Network 

The current conventional lines between Amritsar-New Delhi, and Ahmedabad-Mumbai runs through suburban and rural areas, which are flat and have no tunnels. The Ahmedabad-Mumbai line runs near the coast and therefore, has more bridges, and parts of it are in backwaters or forests. The 1987 RDSO/JICA feasibility study found the Mumbai-Ahmedabad line to be the most promising.

 
 

*DPR = Detailed Project Report

Feasibility studies 

Multiple pre-feasibility and feasibility studies have been done or are in progress.

The consultants for pre-feasibility study for four corridors are:
Systra France's Company for Delhi-Panipat-Ambala-Chandigarh-Ludhiana-Jalandhar-Amritsar,
Systra, Italferr and RITES Limited for Pune – Mumbai – Ahmedabad,
British firm Mott MacDonald for Delhi-Agra-Lucknow-Varanasi-Patna
INECO, PROINTEC, Ayesa for Howrah-Haldia
Japan External Trade Organization (JETRO) and Oriental Consultancy along with Parsons Brinckerhoff India for Chennai-Vijayawada-Dornakal-Kazipet-Hyderabad

In September 2013, an agreement was signed in New Delhi to complete a feasibility study of high-speed rail between Ahmedabad and Mumbai, within 18 months. The study will cost ¥500 million and the cost will be shared 50:50 by Japan and India.

Location of the stations, its accessibility, integration with public transport, parking and railway stations design will play an important role in the success of the high speed railway system. Mumbai may have an underground corridor to have high-speed rail start from the CST terminal. European experiences have shown that railway stations outside the city receive less patronage and ultimately make the high-speed railway line unfeasible.

The feasibility study for the Chennai-Bengaluru high-speed rail corridor was completed with co-operation from the German government in November 2018. The study found that the route was feasible. The study proposed constructing 84% of the track on viaducts, 11% underground and the remaining 4% at-grade. The current fastest train on the Chennai-Bengaluru route, the Shatabdi Express, completes the journey in 7 hours.

Diamond Quadrilateral project 

The Diamond Quadrilateral high-speed rail network project is envisioned to connect the four major metro cities of India namely: Chennai, Delhi, Kolkata, and Mumbai. President of India mentioned in his address to the joint session of Parliament on 9 June 2014 that the new Government was committing to build the dream project. Although the route is not yet planned, the alignment could follow the existing Golden Quadrilateral railway line which links other major cities.

Cost 
Japan will cover 80% of the  Mumbai-Ahmedabad project's cost through a soft loan. It is estimated that of the total  crore that will be spent on the 508-km-long high-speed rail corridor project,  crore will be given to India as loans. These loans will be available at 0.1 percent interest and India can repay them in fifty years with a moratorium on repayments of up to fifteen years.

Delays 
After the foundation stone was laid in September 2017, the prime minister had set the deadline of August 2022 to complete the Mumbai-Ahmedabad line. A senior board member of Railways had also said that they were in no mood to delay the project. As of October 2018, a year since the foundation stone was laid, only 0.9 of 1,400 hectares land required was acquired due to the protests from farmers against the project. The farmers cited that a lower compensation was provided for the land acquired. This initiated the risk of delay by pushing the deadline beyond 2023. Two years later, the land acquisition was further delayed due to the change in the state government of Maharashtra. The new government reviewed the projects of previous government, including the bullet train project in order to arrange the priorities.

Land acquisition issues, low participation from Japanese companies, steep rates quoted by the bidders were some of the factors which pushed the deadline by five years and the NHSRCL set a new deadline of October 2028, as opposed to the original plan of December 2023, which was decided after conducting a feasibility study. However, India was keen on operating a portion of the line by August 2022. Later in December 2021, the new railway minister, Ashwini Vaishnaw said in an interview that people can start boarding the bullet train by the year 2026, even if the project is delayed in the future, it won't be for more than a year and could see the light of the day by 2028.

Semi-high-speed rail

Semi-high-speed services

This became India's first semi-high-speed train. Due to low occupancy, Indian Railways first extended this train from Agra to Gwalior on 19 February 2018 and then to Jhansi on 1 April 2018. Due to its commercial success, Indian Railways plans to start additional semi-high speed services along with the Delhi - Bhopal / Chandigarh / Kanpur routes.

Tejas Express : On 22 May 2017, the Tejas Express started service, featuring modern onboard facilities and automatic doors. On 24 May 2017, the first line was opened from Mumbai to Goa. On 1 March 2019, second Tejas Express service of the country started between Chennai and Madurai by the prime minister. A third route from Lucknow to Delhi was inaugurated on 4 October 2019. This became the India's first train which was operated by private operators, IRCTC, a subsidiary of Indian Railways. A fourth line from Mumbai and Ahmedabad is also operated by IRCTC was inaugurated on 17 January 2020.

It was made by Integral Coach Factory (ICF) at Perambur, Chennai under the Indian government's Make in India campaign. In October 2019, the second Vande Bharat Express was opened from Delhi to Katra. On 30 September 2022, Prime Minister Narendra Modi inaugurated a 3rd Vande Bharat Express rake connecting Mumbai and Ahmedabad passing through Surat. This rake was an upgraded second generation version.

Tejas Rajdhani Express: Indian Railways started to upgrade Rajdhani Coaches to Tejas coaches. These trains are called the Tejas-Rajdhani Express. This replaced its traditional LHB Rajdhani coaches On 15 February 2021,The Agartala Rajdhani Express was upgraded with Tejas livery Sleeper coaches. On 19 July 2021, the Mumbai Rajdhani Express was upgraded to Tejas class smart Coaches. On 1 September 2021 the Rajendra Nagar Patna Rajdhani Express was upgraded to Tejas rakes. The train can travel at a top speed of  if infrastructure permits.

Track upgrades 

Proposals 
France : In February 2014, Henri Poupart-Lafarge of Alstom, manufacturer of trains used on TGV in France, stated that India is at least 5–10 years away from high-speed trains.

China : Feasibility study of running semi-high-speed trains on the 500 km Chennai–Mysore section was submitted by the China Railway Group Limited (CREEC) to the Indian Railway Board. It envisions reducing travel time from the existing 7 hours to 4 hours and 45 minutes.

Germany : The German finance ministry had agreed to finance a government feasibility study into a high-speed rail link between Chennai and Mysore. It had also discussed a project to modernise the Chennai–Hyderabad route.

Germany is also conducting a feasibility study for running trains at a speed of about 300 km/h on the 450 km long Chennai–Mysuru route. A pre-feasibility study was already completed in 2016 by the consortium of consultants comprising DB E&C, Intraplan Consult and Ingenieurburo Vossing.

Spain :
In 2016, there were plans to run Spain's Talgo trains in Delhi–Mumbai route. This was later rejected by the Indian government since the trains were not suited for Indian tracks and since they could not reach their maximum speed. Instead, the government indigenously manufactured the Vande Bharat Express or Train 18 as a part of its Make in India campaign. It achieved a top speed of  during trial runs.

Criticism of Delhi-Agra line
Critics point out that Delhi-Agra time savings are not based on the speed of the train, but based on other factors. According to critics, the reduction in travel time due to speed is sheer three minutes, and that the other manoeuvrings are largely accountable for the drastic drop. The reduction of time is greatly due to shifting the train's departure point from New Delhi railway station to Hazrat Nizamuddin and doing away with the scheduled stop at Mathura reportedly saving 14 minutes. Limiting the locomotive to 10 coaches (Bhopal Shatabdi has 14) leads to a reduction of another two minutes. Thus track improvements and superior infrastructure lead to a reduction of only five minutes, three minutes owing to route relay and interlocking at Agra, and one minute each due to the approval to run a passenger train on the third line at Palwal and Bhuteshwar, installation of thick web switches at four points and putting up a track station at Chhata.

There were also serious questions raised about the safety of the passengers as the infrastructure on which semi-high speed trains are running may not be able to run at such high speeds. For example, it is preferred to run these higher-speed trains on 60-kilogram tracks, but as of now they are running on 52-kilogram tracks.

Alternative technologies

Maglev
Indian Railways explored the possibility of maglev trains in India. The railway ministry's vision was to make rolling stock the driver for India's shift from being a technology importer to a manufacturer and developer, by becoming a designer for future rolling stock technology. Maglev technology has consistently been shown to be more than double the cost of "standard steel-to-steel bullet trains" such as with the Chuo Shinkansen in Japan.

In 2016, Indian Railways announced a seminar with ultra-high-speed train manufacturers to explore the possibility of introducing an ultra-high-speed train system on a public–private partnership basis. The corporation has issued an Expression of Interest (EOI) to global investors to implement an over- rail system. Transport infrastructure (including stations, platforms, tracks, signal systems, fare structures and timetables) would be developed by private firms; Indian Railways would handle land-related issues, and the revenue would be shared. The new railway system, parallel to the current one, should support passenger and freight traffic. In September 2020, Bharat Heavy Electricals Limited signed a pact with SwissRapide AG to bring MagLev metro systems in India.

Hyperloop 
There is no currently operational hyperloop system in the world. Although there has been human testing. speed projections depend on significant engineering advances, and have not yet been observed.

Mumbai-Pune Hyperloop
The proposed 1,000 km/h hyperloop system would take 14 minutes compared to the current 3 hours to commute between these two cities while carrying 10,000 commuters per hour (5,000 in each direction). Hyperloop One, the firm proposing the route, believes that it is feasible and can be made operational by 2026 as per its Detailed Project Report submitted to Pune Metropolitan Region Development Authority (PMRDA) in January 2018. Hyperloop One propose three possible terminal end-points options in Mumbai, namely Dadar, Santacruz and the Chhatrapati Shivaji Maharaj International Airport. Currently, 3,00,000 people commute daily between these two cities daily in 1,10,000 vehicles (including 80,000 cars and 6,000 buses).

Amritsar-Chandigarh Hyperloop
Virgin Hyperloop signed a Memorandum of Understanding (MoU) with the state of Punjab on 3 December 2019. The trip taken by the Hyperloop system is estimated to be at least 10 times faster than a trip taken by existing transport infrastructure of road, rail or flight.

Bengaluru-Chennai Hyperloop
Los Angeles-based Hyperloop One, has signed a MoU with Karnataka government to conduct a feasibility study for the route between Bangalore and Chennai. According to its sponsors, such a Hyperloop will reduce the travel time to 20 minutes between the two cities.

Technology

Shinkansen 

The Indian railways will construct bullet train assembly facilities on a public-private participation (PPP) model. According to National High Speed Rail Corporation Limited (NHSRCL), Japanese companies are likely to set up manufacturing facilities in India to build the parts for bullet train sets. The initial sets will be imported from Japan in phases one and two, with the 18 sets in the first phase costing ₹7,000 Crores for Mumbai-Ahmedabad line, but starting from phase three, India plans to manufacture the sets locally under Make in India initiative. The Indian railways in September 2018 gave a presentation to the working representatives of Japan and India about the Modern Coach Factory (MCF) in Raebareli as a potential manufacturing site for bullet trains. The official said that MCF has robotic production lines and can be ideal for manufacturing bullet train coaches.

Indigenous technology 
In 2019, The Vande Bharat Express or Train 18 replaced Shatabdi Express on two routes and has been planned to replace all the available Shatabdi services after subsequent production. 'Train 20' is another proposed Semi-high-speed train service, which is expected to run on longer distances and hence it will be an overnight train replacing the existing Rajdhani Express service. Vande Bharat Express had begun commercial operation on 15 February 2019, while the Train 20 was supposed to roll out in 2020, but owing to some of the internal issues, the train has not seen any light of the day yet. However, both of these trains will be manufactured by Integral Coach Factory (ICF).

These trains have driver cabins on both ends, which eliminates the time needed for turnaround at the terminal station. Since these are EMU train sets, the time and distance taken to accelerate and decelerate is reduced, enabling the train to travel at a top speed for longer distance. The coaches have automatic sliding doors, onboard Wi-Fi service, GPS based information system, wide windows, bio-toilets and are fully air-conditioned. The rake of Vande Bharat Express has sixteen coaches, consisting of two Executive Chair Cars and fourteen AC Chair Cars, it is being operated at 130 km/h due to track limitations. Train 20 is set to have twenty coaches consisting of AC First Class sleeper, AC II Tier sleeper, AC III Tier sleeper classes and an AC Chair Car, it is set to operate at 160 km/h. Train 20's proposed top speed was announced to be at 176 km/h.

Construction technology 

The Mega Carrier and Launcher Machines or Transporter, Gantry and Full Spam Launcher Machines are the machines that are used to construct viaducts (elevated structures) for bullet train corridors in China. These vehicles carry a full girder by traveling on an already launched girder to place the next girder. The speed was seven times faster compared to the previous girder launching mechanism in India. While the Chinese machine laid two girders a day, the previous Indian girder launching mechanism placed one and half girder in a week. The NHSRCL had posed a challenge to build such machines for L&T which is currently constructing the  stretch of Mumbai-Ahmedabad line. Each of these machines would cost around ₹70-80 crores, and 30 such machines would be required to construct  stretch within next four years as told by managing director of NHSRCL, Achal Khare.

On 9 September 2021, India joined Norway, Italy, China and South Korea to possess Full Span Launching Methodology (FSLM) technology after L&T was successfully able to develop it indigenously. NHSRCL will acquire 20 of such machines for their Mumbai-Ahmedabad high-speed rail project in order to ramp up the construction progress. These machines can be further used to build viaducts for elevated roads and rapid transit systems across India.

Rolling stock

Research and Development

Railway University
Indian Railways are not yet capable of manufacturing indigenously built high-speed trains, in a step towards it, the Indian railways had planned to set up Railway Universities for students who would help in building modern railway infrastructure. These universities will fill the void left by existing technological universities where rail technology was not taught because there were not many students who would take this course, since it did not offer higher-paying jobs. The Rail-wheel interaction is the most important concept which needs more practicality than the textbook concept, this came out as another issue for universities, since it takes a lot of infrastructure to set up test tacks. These issues would be eliminated thanks to dedicated Rail-technological universities.

One such railway university was opened in Vadodara in 2018, inside of the existing National Academy of Indian Railways in the Pratap Vilas Palace of the erstwhile Gaekwad state. Both the institutions would run from this campus until a greenfield campus is constructed. The Ministry of Railways had identified a 100-acre plot in Vadodara for this purpose. In August 2019, the Gujarat government allotted 76.6 acres of land in Waghodia at the 50 percent of market rate to construct the first Railway University. The campus is set to include various academic buildings, training centres and a hostel.

Other institutions
 Malviya Centre for Railway Technology, IIT (BHU) Varanasi
 Centre for Railways Research, IIT Kharagpur
 Research Design and Standards Organization (RDSO)

Records

Speed records
As of today, Indian Railways is yet to breach the  speed mark. Speed and punctuality were never the primary concerns for the railways since safety was always considered a priority. However, with the recent introduction of services such as Gatimaan, Tejas and Vande Bharat Expresses, Indian railways hope to bridge the gap between world standards and
themselves.

Criticism 
After the project was announced, it drew huge attention and was considered to push India into the elite list of high-speed rail capability, but at the same time, it drew criticism from rail-fans and other experts. It is said that when the Shinkansen technology was built in Japan in the sixties, it challenged air travel which was not as advanced as today and hence was very successful. But the bullet train might not be viable in the modern-day world where the aviation industry has advanced in leaps and bounds in reducing fuel intake, safety, better engines and efficiency. The ticket prices are also said to be more or less the same as air travel between the two cities of Mumbai and Ahmedabad. Critics also point out the fact that the 'white elephant' project is paid on the loan which not only makes it difficult to attain profits but also pushes the responsibility of returning it to India's next generations.

It is also said that the cities such as Bilimora, Bharuch and Surat are not languishing today for the sole reason that they do not have high-speed rail connectivity. The critics add that although India is capable of constructing bullet trains, it cannot afford the bullet train in its current configuration. Instead, India can put a great deal of effort into its ageing railway system, expanding existing metro systems in tier-one cities and constructing new ones in tier-two cities.

Other critics conclude that India could invest in alternative technologies such as maglev in a similar way to how Shinkansen in Japan was developed in the 1960s.

Other critiques also say that the standard gauge for high-speed rail goes against the Project Unigauge which was initiated by the railways in 1992. It was also cited that broad gauge provides better stability and therefore the broad gauge railway would be equal or better suited for high-speed rail in India, this would also reduce the cost of constructing a greenfield line.

See also 

Similar
 High-speed rail in Japan
 High-speed rail in China
 High-speed rail in Europe
 High-speed rail in Indonesia
 High-speed rail in the United States

Notes

References

External links 
 Official website of High Speed Rail Corporation India Limited

 
High-speed rail in Asia